The 1999 Nigerian Senate election in Bauchi State was held on February 20, 1999, to elect members of the Nigerian Senate to represent Bauchi State. Bashir Mustapha representing Bauchi North, Idi Othman Guda representing Bauchi Central and Salisu Matori representing Bauchi South all won on the platform of the Peoples Democratic Party.

Overview

Summary

Results

Bauchi North 
The election was won by Bashir Mustapha of the Peoples Democratic Party.

Bauchi Central 
The election was won by Idi Othman Guda of the Peoples Democratic Party.

Bauchi South 
The election was won by Salisu Matori of the Peoples Democratic Party.

References 

Bau
Bauchi State Senate elections
February 1999 events in Nigeria